Industrial finishing is any kind of secondary process done to any metal, plastic, or wood product used in a common market such as automotive, OEM, telecommunications or point-of-purchase. The most common commodity in the industrial finishing market is plastic parts. These can be injection molded, thermoformed, extruded or vacuum formed. Most parts are painted but can be pad printed or silkscreened.

One finishing process is vacuum metalising.

See also
Surface finishing

Coatings
Metalworking